is a Japanese badminton player specializing in doubles. He competed at the 2016 Summer Olympics in Rio de Janeiro, Brazil.

Achievements

BWF Grand Prix 
The BWF Grand Prix had two levels, the Grand Prix and Grand Prix Gold. It was a series of badminton tournaments sanctioned by the Badminton World Federation (BWF) and played between 2007 and 2017.

Men's doubles

  BWF Grand Prix Gold tournament
  BWF Grand Prix tournament

BWF International Challenge/Series 
Men's doubles

  BWF International Challenge tournament
  BWF International Series tournament

References

External links 
 

1985 births
Living people
Sportspeople from Shiga Prefecture
Japanese male badminton players
Badminton players at the 2016 Summer Olympics
Olympic badminton players of Japan
21st-century Japanese people